Antonín Jiránek (Anton Giranek, c. 1712 – 16 January 1761) was a Bohemian violinist and composer.

Life 
Born in Mladá Boleslav, Jiránek was trained in Prague. He was the first violinist in the royal chapel in Warsaw and later in the Polish court chapel in Dresden. He composed symphonies, concerts, trio sonatas and vocal music in sensitive style. At the beginning of the 20th century, musicologists were able to attribute some of the works to his namesake František Jiránek.

Robert Eitner indicates that his daughter Franziska was the famous singer "Madame Koch" Another daughter was the theatre actress Karoline Krüger.

Jiránek died in Dresden.

References

Further reading 
 Alfred Baumgartner: Propyläen Welt der Musik. Volume 3: Hauff - Menalt. , Berlin 1989, .

External links 
 
 Jiránek, Antonín on NKCR
 

1710s births
1761 deaths
18th-century violinists
Czech classical violinists
Czech classical composers
People from Mladá Boleslav